is a Japanese actress and TV personality. In 1999, she won the Japanese Academy Award for "Best Newcomer" for her performance in Give It All; in 2001, she received a "Best Actress" nomination for First Love.

Selected filmography

Films
 Give It All (1998)
 GTO (1999)
 First Love (2000) 
 Ekiden (2000)
 Suki (2001)
 Tokyo Marigold (2001)
 Gangushurisha (2002)
 Thirteen Steps (2002)
 Drugstore Girl (2003)
 A Day on the Planet (2004)
 Legend of Nin Nin Ninga Hattori (2004)
 Ubume no Natsu (2005)
 The Suspect: Muroi Shinji (2005)
 Tripping (2006)
 Waiting in the Dark (2006)
 Gegege no Kitaro (2007)
 Town of Evening Calm, Country of Cherry Blossoms (2007)
 The Silver Season (2008)
 10 Promises to My Dog (2008)
 Mōryō no Hako (2008)
 Yamazakura (2008)
 The Taste of Fish (2008)
 Kitaro and the Millennium Curse (2008)
 Flowers (2010)
 Genji Monogatari: Sennen no Nazo (2011)
 The Wings of the Kirin (2012), Tokiko Kanamori
 Desperate Sunflowers (2016)
 The Katsuragi Murder Case (2016)
 Dear Etranger (2017)
 The Crimes That Bind (2018), Tokiko Kanamori
 Inubu: The Dog Club (2021), Mitsuko Kadowaki
 Fukuda-mura Jiken (2023), Shizuko Sawada

Television
 Taira no Kiyomori (2012) – Yura Gozen
 Hana Moyu (2015) – Mōri Yasuko
 Akira and Akira (2017) – Ai Kitamura
 North Light (2020)
 The Grand Family (2021)

References

External links
  
 

1980 births
Living people
Japanese actresses
People from Kurume